The Madison County School District is a public school district based in Richmond, Kentucky (USA). In addition to Richmond, the district serves the communities of Kingston, Kirksville, Waco, and all rural areas in Madison County.

The district includes two high schools (Madison Central High School and Madison Southern High School), five middle schools (Foley Middle School, Farristown Middle School, Madison Middle School, Clark-Moores Middle School, and B. Michael Caudill Middle School), and 10 elementary schools (Boonesborough Elementary School, Daniel Boone Elementary School, Glenn Marshall Elementary School, Kingston Elementary School, Kirksville Elementary School, Kit Carson Elementary School, Shannon Johnson Elementary School, Silver Creek Elementary School, Waco Elementary School, and White Hall Elementary School), and also a kindergarten facility called Madison Kindergarten Academy. 

In 1988 the Richmond Independent School District merged into the Madison County school district.

References

External links
Madison County Schools website

Education in Madison County, Kentucky
School districts in Kentucky
School districts established in 1932
1932 establishments in Kentucky